Mason City Schools may refer to the following school districts in the United States:

 Mason City Community School District in Mason City, Iowa
 Mason City Schools (Ohio) in Mason, Ohio
 Mason Independent School District in Mason, Texas